Guido Hinterseer (born 7 May 1964) is an Austrian former alpine skier.

World Cup results
Top 5

References

External links
 

1964 births
Living people
Austrian male alpine skiers
People from Kitzbühel
Sportspeople from Tyrol (state)
20th-century Austrian people